Robert Kridler Cope (September 3, 1911 – June 16, 1995) was an American professional basketball player. He played for the Akron Goodyear Wingfoots in the National Basketball League during the 1937–38 season. In his brief professional career, Cope averaged 4.7 points per game and contributed towards the Wingfoots' league championship.

References

1911 births
1995 deaths
Akron Goodyear Wingfoots players
American men's basketball players
Basketball players from Ohio
Centers (basketball)
Forwards (basketball)
Mount Union Purple Raiders men's basketball players
People from Salem, Ohio
People from Stafford Township, New Jersey
Sportspeople from Ocean County, New Jersey